Englewood High School may refer to:

(all in the United States)
 Englewood High School (Colorado), 
 Englewood High School (Florida)
 Englewood Technical Prep Academy, Illinois

See also
 Dwight Morrow High School, the comprehensive public high school of Englewood, New Jersey